Open Pluggable Specification (OPS) is a computing module plug-in format available for adding computing capability to flat panel displays.

The format was first announced by NEC, Intel, and Microsoft in 2010.

Computing modules in the OPS format are available on Intel- and ARM-based CPUs, running operating systems including Microsoft Windows and Google Android.

The main benefit of using OPS in digital signage is to reduce downtime and maintenance cost by making it extremely easy to replace the computing module in case of a failure.

Technical specification 

 A computing module fully enclosed in a 180mm x 119mm x 30mm box
 JAE TX25 plug connector and TX24 receptacle
 80-pin contacts
 Supported interfaces:
 Power
 HDMI/DVI and DisplayPort
 Audio
 USB 2.0/3.0
 UART
 OPS control signals

Pin definition

Succession 

The OPS format is planned to be succeeded by the Smart Display Module (SDM) format.

References 

Display technology